The 2018–19 Temple Owls basketball team represented Temple University during the 2018–19 NCAA Division I men's basketball season. The Owls, led by head coach Fran Dunphy in his 13th and final season with the Owls, played their home games at the Liacouras Center in Philadelphia as members of the American Athletic Conference. They finished the season 23–10, 13–5 in AAC play to finish in a tie for third place. They lost in the quarterfinals of the AAC tournament to Wichita State. They received an at-large bid to the NCAA tournament where they lost in the First Four to Belmont.

This was Fran Dunphy's final season as Temple head coach, as the school announced on April 13, 2018, that he would step down at the end of the season with top assistant and former Owls star Aaron McKie succeeding him in 2019.

Previous season 
The Owls finished the 2017–18 season 17–16, 8–10 in AAC play to finish in seventh place. In the AAC tournament, they defeated Tulane before losing to Wichita State in the quarterfinals. They received a bid to the National Invitation Tournament where they lost to Penn State in the first round.

Shortly after the season, head coach Fran Dunphy announced that the 2018–19 season would be his last at Temple. Top assistant and former Owls star Aaron McKie was named as his designated successor.

Offseason

Departures

Incoming transfers

2018 recruiting class

Roster

Schedule and results

|-
!colspan=12 style=| Regular season

|-
!colspan=12 style=| AAC Tournament

|-
!colspan=9 style=| NCAA tournament
|-

References

Temple Owls men's basketball seasons
Temple
Temple
Temple
Temple